Gabriella Kain (born 1981) is a former Swedish handball goalkeeper. She last played for the club RK Krim and on the Swedish national team. She competed at the 2010 European Women's Handball Championship where the Swedish team placed second.

References

External links

1981 births
Living people
Swedish female handball players
Handball players at the 2012 Summer Olympics
Olympic handball players of Sweden
Handball players from Stockholm
21st-century Swedish women